Cokinos is a surname. Notable people with the surname include:

Christopher Cokinos (born 1963), American poet and writer
Dean Cokinos, American football coach